Øvrebø is a rural district and village in Vennesla municipality in Agder county, Norway.

The district of Øvrebø covers the central part of Vennesla municipality. Historically, the district of Øvrebø was a separate municipality known as Øvrebø which existed from 1838 until 1865, and then again from 1896 until 1964.  In Skarpengland, there is a bank, a post office, several stores, a motor repair shop, and a school. Øvrebø is known for the "Øvrebø ski", found at Mushom and considered for many years to be Norway's oldest preserved ski. It can be seen in the Holmenkollen Ski Museum in Oslo.

Name
The village is named after the old Øvrebø farm (Old Norse: Øfribœr), since the first Øvrebø Church was built there. The first part of the name means "upper" and second part of the name is identical with the word bœr which means "farm" and it is cognate with the Dutch language word "boer" which means "farmer". The name therefore means "the upper farm".

See also
History of skiing

References

External links

Weather information for Øvrebø 

Vennesla
Villages in Agder